or pulp fiction author Robert F. Burkhardt who use the nom de plume Rob Eden

Robert F. Burkardt (October 17, 1923 – December 1, 2006) was a Republican member of the Pennsylvania House of Representatives.

References

1923 births
2006 deaths
Politicians from Pittsburgh
Republican Party members of the Pennsylvania House of Representatives
20th-century American politicians